Ocean Boys Football Club were a Nigerian football club based in Brass, Bayelsa State.

History
Ocean Boys F.C. was founded  in 2002 by Sylva Nathaniel Ngo, the chairman of Brass Local Government. Sylva formed the team to help curb the restiveness among youths in the Niger Delta and "keep the youths away from vices by channelling their energies into worthy endeavours." They were promoted to the top division in Nigerian football, the Nigerian Premier League within three years and were the 2006 league champions in their first season. They won the 2008 FA Cup, the third straight title for the Niger Delta.

Their home stadium was Yenagoa Township Stadium but for the 2009-10 season played some home games at Samuel Ogbemudia Stadium in Benin City.

In December 2010 the team was left in shock by the death of defender Emmanuel Ogoli, who collapsed during a game, and a horrendous car crash in which defender Okechukwu Akabogu and third choice keeper Austino Egbe sustained severe injuries.
They were disqualified from the Premier League and relegated in 2012 for not fulfilling their fixtures. All games involving them were thrown out and the league table recalculated.
They were admitted after debate into the National League and changed their name to Divine Warriors F.C. However, after nine games (and just two wins) manager Ada Gwegwe resigned, and due to finances the team sold their slot in the league to Fountain F.C. before going on hiatus.

Achievements
Nigerian Premier League: 1
2006.

Nigerian FA Cup: 1
2008.

Nigerian Super Cup: 1
2006.

Performance in CAF competitions
CAF Champions League: 1 appearance
2007 - Preliminary Round

CAF Confederation Cup: 1 appearance
2009 - First Round

Staff

Manager 
TBA

Media officer 
 Eddy Ohis Asein

Head coach
  Larry Eteli

Former coaches
 Maurice Cooreman (2006)
 Tunde Disu (2007)
 Lucky Igadi (????)
 Evans Ogenyi (2008–09)
 Lawrence Akpokona (2009)
 Emmanuel Amuneke (2009–??)
 Samson Unuanuel (2011–12)
 Ada Gwegwe (2012–13)

References

 
Football clubs in Bayelsa State
Association football clubs established in 2002
2002 establishments in Nigeria
Defunct football clubs in Nigeria
Sports clubs in Nigeria